Microcolus is a genus of sea snails, marine gastropod mollusks in the family Fasciolariidae, the spindle snails, the tulip snails and their allies.

Species
Species within the genus Microcolus include:
 Microcolus apiciliratus 
 Microcolus dunkeri (Jonas, 1846) 
 Microcolus transennus 
 Microcolus vaginatus

References

Fasciolariidae